Fulton Adventist University College is a co-educational boarding tertiary institution situated on the western side of Viti Levu on the main island of Fiji. It is operated by the Seventh-day Adventist church and serves the island countries of Fiji, American Samoa, Cook Islands, Kiribati, French Polynesia, Nauru, New Caledonia, Niue, Samoa, Solomon Islands, Tonga, Tuvalu, and Vanuatu. Its services are also offered to Pacific Islanders and other interested individuals living in Australia, New Zealand and overseas.

Fulton Adventist University College is a part of the Seventh-day Adventist education system, the world's second largest Christian school system.

Campus
The college is approximately 10 km from Nadi International Airport on Sabeto Road. The College campus is set on a  property in the Sabeto Valley under the Sleeping Giant. This relocated campus was opened on 12 February 2014.

Academic divisions
Fulton is divided into the following divisions offering the following degrees (diplomas also available in all degree areas)
Business
Bachelor of Business [Accounting & Management], Bachelor of Business [Information Systems], Bachelor of Business [Marketing]

Education
Bachelor of Education Honours [Primary], Bachelor of Education [Primary], Bachelor of Education [Early Childhood], Postgraduate Diploma in Education,
Graduate Diploma in Adventist Education
 
Theology
Bachelor of Theology Honours, Bachelor of Theology, Postgraduate Diploma in Theology, Graduate Diploma in Adventist Studies, Graduate Diploma in Theology

Foundation Studies
Certificate in Foundation Studies [Business], [Education], [Theology]

See also

 List of Seventh-day Adventist colleges and universities
 Seventh-day Adventist education

References

External links
 Official Website

Universities and colleges affiliated with the Seventh-day Adventist Church
Education in Fiji
Educational institutions established in 1905
1905 establishments in Fiji